Annisa Larasati Pohan or better known as Annisa Pohan (born November 20, 1981) is an American-born Indonesian actress, model, presenter and former radio announcer .

Early life 
Pohan was born in Boston, Massachusetts. She is the second of three children and the only daughter of Aulia Pohan from North Sumatra and Mulyaningsih. Her father was a former Deputy Governor of Bank of Indonesia. She followed her father to Tokyo, Japan for several years. She lived in Jakarta from elementary school to high school (SMA Negeri 70 Bulungan). She holds an economics degree from  Padjadjaran University, Bandung and a master Management degree from University of Indonesia.

Career
In 1997, when she was fifteen years old, Pohan participated in a teenage model search called Gadis Sampul, coming second runner up. She  pursued an entertainment career and worked as a radio announcer Oforz Radio . She also came the presenter of various TV programs such as Sport RCTI, Bundesliga, La Liga, Celebrity Jam and Good Morning on the Weekend.

Tunggadewi Foundation
Pohan is the founder of Tunggadewi Foundation, which aids women and children. It was founded in 2009 by Pohan and her friends, including Rumah Pintar (Smart House) and Jendela Dunia (Window on the World). It offers informal learning centers free of charge to children and their mothers.

The name Tunggadewi was taken from a queen who reigned during the period of the Majapahit Kingdom and was known for the way in which her wisdom and justice brought prosperity and well being to her people. The name reflects their hope that the Foundation can bring well being to the people by focusing on empowering women and enhancing education.

Personal life
She married Agus Harimurti Yudhoyono, the first son of former President of Indonesia Susilo Bambang Yudhoyono and his wife, Kristiani Herrawati, in 2005. After their long period of relationship, they married on 8 July 2005. The reception was held in Bogor Palace, in Bogor, West Java.

In 2008, the first daughter of Pohan and Yudhoyono, Almira Tunggadewi Yudhoyono was born on 17 August, on Indonesian Independence day.

In 2009, Pohan followed her husband to the United States where he took Master of Public Administration at the John F. Kennedy School of Government at Harvard, Massachusetts, US, and Maneuver Captains Career Course at Fort Benning, Georgia. In 2011 Pohan and her family returned  to Indonesia.

References

1981 births
Living people
People from Jakarta
People from Boston
Indonesian female models
Indonesian television presenters
Indonesian sports announcers
Indonesian socialites
People of Batak descent
University of Indonesia alumni
Yudhoyono family
Indonesian women television presenters